EE1 or ee1 may refer to:

Empire Earth (video game), a video game
Epsilon Euskadi ee1, a racing car
LNER Class EE1, an electric locomotive